The Bishop House in Falmouth, Kentucky, at 200 4th St., was built in 1880 to serve as a residence and store.  It was listed on the National Register of Historic Places in 1983.

It was deemed notable as a good example of a late 19th century eclectic vernacular frame house.

Its original owner was Bemard H. Piening, about whom not much is known.

References

National Register of Historic Places in Pendleton County, Kentucky
Houses completed in 1880
1880 establishments in Kentucky
Houses in Pendleton County, Kentucky
Houses on the National Register of Historic Places in Kentucky
Falmouth, Kentucky